Huang Gun (Chinese: 黄滚; Pinyin: Huáng Gǔn) is a character featured within the famed classic Chinese novel Fengshen Yanyi.

Huang Gun is the father of Prince Huang Feihu and has guarded the Demarcation Pass for many a year. During the time of Huang Feihu's escape from the capital and his arrival at Demarcation Pass, Huang Gun would coldly scold his child for his betrayal. In time, Radiance would duel it out with the angry Huang Gun while Huang Feihu made his escape. Following a furthered battle with Radiance, Huang Gun would later be tricked by Huang Feihu's generals and be forced to tag along with his son. Huang Gun would thus stand his ground throughout the conflict with Yu Hua and Han Glory. Following the assistance of Nezha at certain points in time and Huang Feihu's arrival within Phoenix City, Huang Gun would remain there as a high ranked commander.

References
 Investiture of the Gods chapter 32 - 33

Investiture of the Gods characters